Lustre is the fourth studio album released by Claire Voyant.

Track listing
 "Lustre"
 "Shine"
 "Into Oblivion"
 "Another Day (The Subtle Thief of Youth)"
 "Mercurial"
 "Painted Gold"
 "Lost"
 "Flicker"
 "Broadcast"
 "Washaway"

External links
Claire Voyant's official website

2009 albums
Claire Voyant (band) albums
Metropolis Records albums